Édouard Brissaud (15 April 1852, Besançon – 20 December 1909) was a French physician and pathologist. He was taught by Jean Martin Charcot at Pitié-Salpêtrière Hospital. He had interests in a number of medical disciplines including motion disturbances, anatomy, neurology and psychiatry. He died of a brain tumour, aged 57.

He has been awarded a large number of eponyms many of which are now rarely used and some were not the dominant eponym in use.

Bourneville-Brissaud disease – tuberous sclerosis. He studied one of the earliest diagnosed cases  with Désiré-Magloire Bourneville in 1881.
Brissaud's scoliosis – a form of scoliosis giving "a list of the lumbar part of the spine away from the affected side in sciatica" (Dorland's Medical Dictionary). Described in 1895.
Brissaud's disease – Tourette syndrome. He gave a detailed description in 1896.
Brissaud's infantilism – infantile myxedema (hypothyroidism). Described in 1907.
Brissaud's reflex – a contraction of the tensor fasciae latae (a thigh muscle) on tickling the sole of the foot.
Brissaud-Sicard syndrome – is "hemiparesis and contralateral hemifacial spasm resulting from a pontine lesion" (Stedman's Medical Dictionary). Described in 1908. Named in conjunction with neurologist Jean-Athanase Sicard.

Papers

References

See also
 Timeline of tuberous sclerosis
 History of Tourette syndrome
 A Clinical Lesson at the Salpêtrière

1852 births
1909 deaths
French pathologists
Physicians from Besançon